Parliamentary elections were held in the Slovak Socialist Republic on 5 and 6 June 1981 alongside national elections. All 150 seats in the National Council were won by the National Front.

Results

References

1981 elections in Czechoslovakia
Parliamentary elections in Slovakia
Legislative elections in Czechoslovakia
Slovakia
One-party elections
June 1981 events in Europe